Székkutas (historically ) is a village in Csongrád county, in the Southern Great Plain region of southern Hungary.

References

Populated places in Csongrád-Csanád County